Zoroastrian Empire may refer to empires with Zoroastrianism as the state religion: 

Achaemenid Empire, an empire based in Western Asia in Iran, founded in the 6th century BCE by Cyrus the Great
Parthian Empire, a major Iranian political and cultural power in ancient Iran, founded in 247 BCE and dissolved in 224 CE
Sasanian Empire, the last Iranian empire before the rise of Islam, ruled by the Sasanian dynasty from 224 CE to 651 CE